Roy W. Howard (1883–1964) was an American newspaperman with a long association with E. W. Scripps Company. He was president of E. W. Scripps Company and the United Press, and chairman of Scripps Howard Newspapers.

He began his newspaper career as a paperboy in Indianapolis, Indiana, but quickly moved up.  He was a reporter for the Indianapolis Star, then became New York correspondent for Scripps-McRae Newspapers. He quickly made a name for  himself and, in 1912, had worked his way up to president of United Press.

During the First World War, he served as a war correspondent in Europe, and accidentally sent a false report of the Armistice four days before it was actually signed. Howard's reputation survived and in 1917 he became a Scripps partner, whose name appeared in one of the Scripps subsidiary companies, the Scripps Howard News Service.

He moved to Scripps newspapers in 1920, and, by 1922, he was leading the company, E. W. Scripps Company a position he kept for four decades. On November 3, 1922, the Scripps-McRae League was renamed Scripps-Howard Newspapers to recognize Howard.

Despite his management role, he continued to work as a reporter; in 1933 he went to Manchuria to cover the Sino-Japanese war, interviewing the puppet emperor of Manchukuo Puyi. He also met with Japanese Emperor Hirohito. In 1936 he interviewed Josef Stalin.

A digitized archive of his personal papers is available via Indiana University.

See also 
 Scripps Howard Foundation

References

Notes

Sources consulted
 Beard, Patricia.  Newsmaker: Roy W. Howard, The Mastermind Behind the Scripps-Howard News Empire from the Gilded Age to the Atomic Age (Lyons Press, 2016), 325 pp.
 Casey, Ralph D. "Scripps-Howard Newspapers in the 1928 Presidential Campaign." Journalism & Mass Communication Quarterly 7.3 (1930): 209–231.
 Daniel, Douglass K. "They liked Ike: Pro-Eisenhower publishers and his decision to run for president." Journalism & Mass Communication Quarterly 77.2 (2000): 393–404.

External links 
 Archives at Indiana University

1883 births
1964 deaths
Writers from Indianapolis
American male journalists